Juankoski is a former town and municipality of Finland. In March 2014, the Juankoski city council decided that the town would merge with Kuopio in the beginning of 2017.

Juankoski is located in the province of Eastern Finland, part of the Northern Savonia region. Juankoski formally became a town in 1998.

Neighbouring municipalities of Juankoski include Juuka, Kaavi, Tuusniemi, Kuopio, Nilsiä and Rautavaara.

The former municipality is unilingually Finnish.

History
In 1746, Brynolf Brunou established an ironworks near the rapids between Vuotjärvi and Akonvesi. The area was a part of the Nilsiä chapel community of the Kuopio parish. Nilsiä became a separate parish in 1816 and a municipality in 1869. Juankoski was moved to the Muuruvesi parish in 1907, remaining a part of it until Juankoski became a separate municipality in 1923. Muuruvesi and Säyneinen were consolidated with Juankoski in 1971.

Juankoski was consolidated with Kuopio in 2017.

Museum Masuuni Brunou focuses on the area's iron and cardboard industry, as well as local history.

Villages
Akonvesi, Hipanlahti, Jouhteninen (Joutseninen), Muuruvesi (village), Säyneinen (village), Vehkalahti, Västinniemi and Akonpohja, which is located in address 73500

People
Kaj Chydenius, composer
Jaakko Kolmonen, TV chef
Juice Leskinen, songwriter
Anssi Neuvonen, songwriter / musician

References

External links

Town of Juankoski – Official website

Former municipalities of Finland
Populated places established in 1925
Juankoski